Verbano-Cusio-Ossola (Italian: Provincia del Verbano Cusio Ossola ) is the northernmost province in the Italian region of Piedmont. It was created in 1992 through the fusion of three geographical areas which had previously been part of the Province of Novara. The area flanking the western shore of Verbano (or Lago Maggiore) forms the eastern part of the province; Cusio (or Lago d’Orta) and its environs form the southern part; while the north and west of the province consist of the Ossola, a region of Alpine mountains and valleys. The ISO code for the province is VB.



Municipal subdivisions 
There are 74 comuni in the province. The largest by population are:

Culture

UNESCO Sacred Mountains 
In 2003, the Sacred Mountain of Domodossola and the Sacred Mountain of Ghiffa were inserted by UNESCO in the World Heritage List.

Demographics
 

The top eight countries of origin of the inhabitants of Verbano-Cusio-Ossola with foreign citizenship at December 31, 2010 were:
 Ukraine 1724
 Morocco 1402
 Romania 1233
 Albania 770
 China 737
 Senegal 429
 Germany 315
 Switzerland 219

Footnotes

References

External links 
 
 Portale del Lago Maggiore - a portal run by the local Trading Chamber
 Official web site for European Sacred Mountains 

 
Verbano-Cusio-Ossola